Dhimitër Pasko (13 September 1907 – 4 May 1967) was a well-known Albanian writer, literary critic and translator. Along with Ernest Koliqi he is considered as the founder of modern Albanian prose; in Albanian literature his pen name for which he gained fame was Mitrush Kuteli.

Biography 
Mitrush Kuteli was born Dhimitër Pasko in the town of Pogradec at the shores of Lake of Ohrid, son of Pandeli and Polikseni. His mother was an ethnic Albanian while his father was an ethnic Aromanian. Kuteli studied at a Romanian commercial college in Thessaloniki, later moving to Bucharest where, in 1931, he graduated in economics with a dissertation on the banking system in the Balkans. And in 1934 he earned a doctorate on the field, evaluated with "Diplomam Magnam cum Laudæ".

While in Bucharest he became a journalist and directed the Albanian-language weekly newspaper Shqipëri' e re (New Albania), published in Constanța, from 1928 until 1933. In 1937 he organized the publishing Lasgush Poradeci's collection of verse, Ylli i zemrës (The Star of the heart).

From 1934 he was a high official of the Romanian Ministry of Economy and later on he was the director of the Cernăuți bank.

He returned to Albania in 1942, and during World War II wrote and self-published most of his major works. At the end of the war he founded the short-lived literary periodical, Revista letrare (Literary Review), with Nexhat Hakiu, Vedat Kokona and Sterjo Spasse, joined the editorial board of Bota e re (New World), the first Albanian post-war literary journal, and became a founding member of the Albanian League of Writers and Artists.

Imprisonment and release

The Albanian Communist Party took power after World War II, but by 1947 was in the control of Yugoslavia. Pasko, an official Albanian delegate to Yugoslavia, disapproved of a proposed currency and customs union agreed between the two countries, and of a Serbian re-occupation of Kosovo; an earlier 1944 Pasko poem, "Poem kosovar" (Kosovar poem), asserted his criticism of Serbian actions. Upon the Albanian delegation's return from Yugoslavia, Pasko was sentenced to 15 years imprisonment for his criticism, during which he attempted suicide. Following the freeing of Yugoslavia's hold over Albanian party politics, Pasko was released.

After his release from prison, he was informed by the authorities that his family would be banished to Kavajë. His personal documents were branded with the stamp "Enemy of the people", but his family were saved after the intervention of Fadil Paçrami. Kuteli was given new documents and a job. 
Pasko died of a heart attack in 1967.

Literary works

Economy 
He was the representative of the democratic and bourgeois alternative for the economic development during the reign of King Zog I.

Literature 
He published his first authored book, Netë shqipëtare (Albanian nights) in 1938, a compilation of eight tales of village life from his native Pogradec. This edition was largely destroyed by a fire, and only became widely read through a second edition published in 1944. He worked as a translator for Naim Frashëri Publishing House, the state-owned Tirana publishing company.

Pasko, as with other Albanian writers of the time, accommodated the imposed cultural doctrine of Zhdanovism by translating Soviet-approved Russian authors, although he found himself able to translate his favorite Russian, Romanian, and Spanish writers, publish tales and verse for children, and adapt Albanian oral verse to prose.

Criticism 

It is asserted that he followed Poradeci's tread, although his poetry is even more Romanian in character.

Selected bibliography

 - 1937
 (Albanian nights) - 1938
 (The Chestnut forest) - 1958
 (Ago Jakupi and other stories) - 1943
 (Attack and tears) - 1943
 (Literary Notes) - 1944
 (From peak to peak) - 1944
 (Kapllan agha of Shaban Shpata) - 1944
 (The love of Artan the Barbarian) - 1946
 (Gingerman) - 1962
 (Old Albanian tales) - 1965
 (Selected stories) - 1972
 (Mud from this land) - 1973
 (In a corner of southern Illyria) - 1983
 (Songs and cries from the burnt city)
 (Great is the lament of sin) - 1993
' (The Economist's Diary) - 2012
' (Moldovian Nights) - 2015

Translations

 Eluard, Selected verses
 Gogol, St Petersburg tales and Dead Souls
 Haxhi Agaj, Persian tales
 Ivan Krylov, The Fables
 Lu Xun, Selected works
 Mikhail Saltykov-Shchedrin, The Golovlyov Family
 Pablo Neruda, Que despierte el leñador
 Pushkin, Novels
 Turgeniev, A Sportsman's Sketches;

References

Further reading

 "The Fall of Xheladin Bey": Dhimitër Pasko (Mitrush Kuteli); translation in English by Robert Elsie
Dhimitër Pasko (Mitrush Kuteli) poetry; translation in English by Robert Elsie
"Translators to Albanian: Dhimitër Pasko, Fan S. Noli, Lasgush Poradeci, Vedat Kokona, Gjergj Fishta, Gjekë Marinaj, Kostandin Kristoforidhi". . Retrieved 29 March 2011
Images of Dhimitër Pasko (Mitrush Kuteli). Retrieved 29 March 2011

1907 births
1967 deaths
Albanian male short story writers
Albanian short story writers
Albanian translators
Romanian–Albanian translators
Russian–Albanian translators
Albanian expatriates in Romania
People from Pogradec
People from Manastir vilayet
Albanian people of Aromanian descent
People from the Ottoman Empire of Aromanian descent
Eastern Orthodox Christians from Albania
20th-century translators
Male journalists
Albanian journalists
20th-century Albanian poets
Albanian male poets
20th-century Albanian politicians
Albanian economists
Albanian nationalists
20th-century short story writers
20th-century male writers
20th-century journalists
Deaths from coronary artery disease